Rivington is a village in Lancashire, England.

Rivington may also refer to:
 Rivington & Co., a former English publishing house
 The Rivingtons, an American doo-wop group
 Rivington Pike
 Rivington and Blackrod High School
 Rivington Water Treatment Works
 Upper Rivington Reservoir
 Lower Rivington Reservoir
 Rivington Arms, an art gallery in New York City
 Rivington Street, a street in Manhattan, New York City

People with the surname
 Charles Rivington, British publisher
 James Rivington, English-born American journalist
 Luke Rivington, English Roman Catholic priest and controversial writer

People with the given name
 Rivington Bisland, American Major League Baseball player